Gary Antuanne Russell (born June 14, 1996) is an American professional boxer. As an amateur, he represented the United States in the light welterweight division at the 2016 Summer Olympics, but was controversially eliminated in the third bout. He is the younger brother of former WBC featherweight champion Gary Russell Jr.

All five brothers in his family are named Gary after their father Gary Russell, Sr. Four of them are competitive boxers, trained by their father. On May 20, 2017, he won his professional debut by first-round technical knockout (TKO).

Professional boxing record

References

1996 births
Living people
Light-welterweight boxers
Boxers from Maryland
American male boxers
Olympic boxers of the United States
Boxers at the 2016 Summer Olympics
People from Capitol Heights, Maryland